Korra is a village in the Phulwari tehsil, Patna district, Bihar state, India.

References

Villages in Patna district